Maria Holaus (born 19 December 1983) is a professional alpine skier from Austria. Her specialities are the Downhill and the Super-G.

Career highlights

FIS World Ski Championships
2001 - Verbier,  2nd at downhill (juniors)
2007 - Are, 21st at downhill
World Cup
2007 - San Sicario/Sestriere,  3rd at downhill
2008 - Cortina d'Ampezzo,  1st at super-g
2008 - St. Moritz, 2nd at downhill.
European Cup
2002 - Altenmarkt-Zauchensee (1),  1st at downhill
2002 - Altenmarkt-Zauchensee (2),  1st at downhill
2006 - Altenmarkt-Zauchensee,  1st at downhill
2006 - Altenmarkt-Zauchensee,  2nd at super-g
2006 - Hemsedal (1),  2nd at super-g
2006 - Hemsedal (2),  1st at super-g
2007 - St. Moritz,  2nd at super-g
National Championships
2006 - Altenmarkt-Zauchensee,  1st at downhill

External links
 
 

1983 births
Living people
Austrian female alpine skiers
20th-century Austrian women
21st-century Austrian women